Edwin H. Lothrop was an American politician from Michigan who served in the Michigan House of Representatives both prior to and after statehood, and who served as Speaker of the House during the 9th Legislature (coincidentally, as the 9th Speaker).

Born in 1806, Lothrop was a member of the Lothrop-Campbell political family with his brother, George, serving as the Michigan Attorney General and another family member, James, being the Chief Justice of the Michigan Supreme Court.

References

1806 births
1874 deaths
Members of the Michigan House of Representatives
Speakers of the Michigan House of Representatives
People from Kalamazoo County, Michigan
19th-century American politicians